Madurai Meenakshi is a 1993 Indian Tamil-language film directed by P. Amirtham and written by M. Karunanidhi from a story by P. Harirajan. The film stars Selva and Ranjitha, with Sujatha, Captain Raju, Pradeep Shakthi, Vijayakumar, Nassar, and Sabitha Anand playing supporting roles. It was released on 24 February 1993.

Plot 

Madurai, a traffic police who dreams to become a police inspector, lives with his mother Maragatham. One day, he clashes with Meenakshi, the daughter of the corrupt home minister Ulaganathan. Meenakshi uses her father's clout to change Madurai's duty, and Madurai becomes her house guard. Meenakshi spends her time in humiliating the poor Madurai. Kumarasamy, his brother Kulasekaran, and his sister-in-law Gomathi run a free school for blind children in their property. The prime minister orders Ulaganathan to buy their property. But they refuse to sell it, so Ulaganathan's henchmen kill Kumarasamy. In the meantime, Madurai and Meenakshi fall in love with each other. Ulaganathan gets to know their love and transfers Madurai at the local police station. Inspector Rudra and Ulaganathan decide to buy Kulasekaran's property by force and to send Madurai behind bars. What transpires next forms the rest of the story.

Cast 

Selva as Madurai
Ranjitha as Meenakshi
Sujatha as Maragatham
Captain Raju as Ulaganathan
Pradeep Shakthi as Inspector Rudra
Vijayakumar as Kumarasamy
Nassar as Kulasekaran
Sabitha Anand as Gomathi
S. S. Chandran as Brammayya
Vijay Krishnaraj as Stephen
Chandrasekhar as DGP
Prathapachandran as Judge
Thideer Kannaiah as Madasamy

Production 
The dialogues were written by AR Murugadoss.

Soundtrack 
The soundtrack was composed by Deva, with lyrics written by M. Karunanidhi and Vairamuthu.

Release and reception 
Madurai Meenakshi was released on 24 February 1993. A petition was filed against the film for negative portrayal of politicians; however the Supreme Court rejected the plea. R. P. R. of Kalki appreciated Deva's music, but said Amirtham's cinematography was better than his direction.

References

External links

1990s Tamil-language films
1993 films
Films scored by Deva (composer)
Films with screenplays by M. Karunanidhi